The Rehburg Hills are a hill range, up to , in the districts of Nienburg and Schaumburg in Lower Saxony, Germany.

Origin of the name 
The Rehburg Hills and their foothills give the impression of being several small neighbouring hills. The little village of Bad Rehburg was a well-known spa and bathing resort in the 18th and 19th centuries. As a result, they have been referred to for centuries as the Rehburger Berge or Rehburg Hills.

Geography

Geographical location 
The Rehburg Hills occupy the southern part of the district of Nienburg and northern part of the district of Schaumburg on the southwestern edge of the Steinhuder Meer Nature Park. They lie between Rehburg-Loccum (to the northwest), Hagenburg (to the east) and Sachsenhagen (to the south) and run close by the village of Bad Rehburg that gives them their name. The latter, like the settlements of Loccum, Rehburg, Münchehagen in the west and Winzlar in the east belong to the borough of Rehburg-Loccum. The municipalities of Wölpinghausen (including Bergkirchen) and Auhagen (including Düdinghausen) in the south also lie on the ridge. Away to the south is the Schaumburg Forest, whilst to the northeast is Lake Steinhude (Steinhuder Meer).

Individual hills 
Other summits include the  Wölpinghauser Berg (with its Wilhelm Tower), in the far east, the Düdinghäuser Berg, the Loccumer Berg and the Atgeberg.

From the high points of the Rehburg Hills there are views across to the River Weser, Lake Steinhude, the Deister, Bückeberg, Schaumburg Forest, Stemweder Berg and Wiehen Hills.

Geology 
The bowl-shaped Rehburg Hills were formed by relief inversion. They fall steeply away to the north, but its southern slopes are more gently. The ridge is, from a geological viewpoint, a saddle (the Rehburg Saddle or Rehburger Sattel), which consists of solid rock.

The bulging of the saddle occurred as a result of the movement of Malm Salt (not Zechstein Salt) deep underground that forced the overlying, younger layers of solid rock upwards. In later times the softer rocks in the centre of the saddle (clay and marl, Upper Jurassic) weathered away, creating a morphological depression (relief inversion). The weather-resistant sandstones  (Wealden Sandstones of the Lower Cretaceous) form the flanks of the saddle and produce a bowl-shaped ridge.

In the Wealden Sandstone there are coal deposits of low quality and thickness. After 1945 some of this coal was mined.
Sandstone was quarried in Düdinghausen and to a large extent near Münchehagen.

The Rehburger Berge are covered by a mixed woodland of beech and spruce and surrounded by large areas of moor and lowland. Of the many small streams and becks that drain the ridge, the most notable are the Hülsebeeke in the west near Loccum and the Winzlaer Grenzgraben in the west.

Points of interest 
Amongst the points of interest in the area are the: 
 Münchehagen Dinosaur Park: numerous giant dinosaur tracks near Münchehagen
 800-year-old Cistercian abbey at Loccum, founded in 1163
 Late Romanesque, 13th century church in Loccum, visible from afar
 ecological conservation station of Steinhuder Meer (ÖSSM) in Winzlar
 Wilhelm Tower on the Wölpinghäuser Berg, built in 1848
 Holländer windmill near Bergkirchen, worked from 1850 to 1955
 Evangelical church of St. Catharine in Bergkirchen, built around 1150
 Quarry and coal shaft near Düdinghausen
 Historic spa resort of Bad Rehburg from the Romantic period
 Chapel of St. Friederike, Bad Rehburg
 Foundations of an old abbey near the abandoned village of Asbeke from the 11th century

References 

Hill ranges of Lower Saxony
Schaumburg
Forests and woodlands of Lower Saxony
Rehburg-Loccum